Aulonothroscus is a genus of small false click beetles in the family Throscidae. There are more than 20 described species in Aulonothroscus.

Species
These 26 species belong to the genus Aulonothroscus:

 Aulonothroscus bicarinatus Fleutiaux, 1911
 Aulonothroscus brevicollis (Bonvouloir, 1859)
 Aulonothroscus calocerus (Bonvouloir, 1860)
 Aulonothroscus constrictor (Say, 1839)
 Aulonothroscus convergens (Horn, 1885)
 Aulonothroscus detritus Blanchard, 1917
 Aulonothroscus distans Blanchard, 1917
 Aulonothroscus elongatulus (Wollaston, 1865)
 Aulonothroscus grancanariae (Franz, 1982)
 Aulonothroscus integer (Wollaston, 1857)
 Aulonothroscus laticeps Blanchard, 1917
 Aulonothroscus laticollis (Rybinski, 1897)
 Aulonothroscus latiusculus (Wollaston, 1865)
 Aulonothroscus nodifrons Blanchard, 1917
 Aulonothroscus parallelus Blanchard, 1917
 Aulonothroscus pugnax (Horn, 1885)
 Aulonothroscus punctatus (Bonvouloir, 1859)
 Aulonothroscus rugosiceps Schaeffer, 1916
 Aulonothroscus schwarzi Blanchard, 1917
 Aulonothroscus tambopata Johnson, 2016
 Aulonothroscus tenerifae (Franz, 1982)
 Aulonothroscus teretrius Blanchard, 1917
 Aulonothroscus tschitscherini Yablokov-Khnzorian, 1962
 Aulonothroscus validus (LeConte, 1868)
 Aulonothroscus wollastoni (Franz, 1982)
 † Throscites tschitscherini Yablokov-Khnzorian, 1962

References

Further reading

External links

 

Elateroidea
Articles created by Qbugbot